(abbr.

History 
The  in Berlin was a specialist book and specialist journal publisher in the former German Democratic Republic (GDR). It was founded on 1 July 1946 and was a Volkseigener Betrieb (VEB) (English, "publicly owned enterprise").

During its East German years it also published many trade journals for various technical fields, e.g.

During the early years of the publishing house, the physicist and philosopher  managed the publishing house from 1950 to 1955. A campaign for "pest work in the field of ideology" was initiated against him during this time. Rehabilitated in 1955, he was appointed full professor for dialectical materialism at the Humboldt University of Berlin.

Publishing program 

Book series
The following series were published in the firm's East German period:
 Automatisierungstechnik
 Lehrbücher für die Berufsausbildung
 Lehrbücher für die Berufsbildung
 Schriftenreihe des Verlages Technik

References

External links 
 Website of Verlag Technik in the huss shop of the Huss-Medien GmbH

Volkseigene Betriebe
Publishing companies of Germany
Book publishing companies of Germany
Publishing companies established in 1946